Medical College for Women and Hospital (MCW&H) is a private medical college of Bangladesh exclusively for women. It has currently two academic campuses in Uttara, Dhaka, one in Sector - 1 and the other in Uttarkhan. The college is affiliated with the Dhaka University as a constituent college.

History 
Medical College for Women and Hospital was established in 1992 by a group of people known as the founder members. Their aim was to provide quality medical education, research and services to the people of Bangladesh at reasonable cost. The college and the hospital are run by The Medical and Health Welfare Trust, a nonpolitical nonprofit organisation. The trustees serve without compensation.

Faculty 
The college has a total of 121 faculty members organized in 20 departments representing different fields of medical science. The faculty is led by the Principal Sheikh Firoz Kabir. Different nationally and internationally successful figures took part in its teaching at different times in the past and present as regular teachers.

Board of trustees 

The board of trustees of the institution consists of the four founder members of the college, with the former President of Bangladesh professor A.Q.M. Badruddoza Chowdhury as the chairman, late National Professor M R Khan as the executive chairman, professor A M Mujibul Haq as the member secretary, and late professor Suraiya Jabeen as the founder treasurer.

Recognition 
The college is recognised by the Bangladesh Medical and Dental Council. MCW&H is listed in the World Directory of Medical Schools formerly maintained by the World Health Organization and now maintained as the Avicenna Directory for Medicine. This listing entitles the graduates of MCW&H to recognition all over the world. Graduates of MCW&H are eligible for limited registration with the General Medical Council of United Kingdom. They are also eligible to take the United States Medical Licensing Examination. The degree is also recognized by the Medical Council of India.. The degree is also recognized by the California Medical Board.

References

External links 

Educational institutions of Uttara
Uttara
Hospitals in Dhaka
Medical colleges in Bangladesh
Universities and colleges in Dhaka
Educational institutions established in 1992
1992 establishments in Bangladesh
Private hospitals in Bangladesh